The 1891 New South Wales colonial election was held in the then colony of New South Wales between 17 June to 3 July 1891. This election was for all of the 141 seats in the New South Wales Legislative Assembly and it was conducted in 35 single-member constituencies, 20 2-member constituencies, 10 3-member constituencies and nine 4-member constituencies, all with a first past the post system. Part 1 (section 10) of the Electoral Act of 1880 set the qualification for election on "every male subject of Her Majesty of the full age of twenty-one years and absolutely free being a natural born or naturalized subject". Seven seats were uncontested. The previous parliament of New South Wales was dissolved on 6 June 1891 by the Governor, The Earl of Jersey, on the advice of the Premier, Sir Henry Parkes.

The election saw the first appearance of the Labor Party (then known as the Labour Electoral League of New South Wales), which won 35 seats, taking a significant number of votes and seats from both of the previous two major parties in the Assembly, and giving Labour the balance of power. The main political parties in New South Wales, the Protectionist Party and the Free Trade Party both lost seats to Labour. Parkes held on as Premier until October 1891 when he again lost a vote in the Legislative Assembly, causing Parkes to resign as Premier and leader of the Free Trade Party. George Dibbs (Protectionist) became Premier after he arranged for support for his government from Labour.

Key dates

Results

{{Australian elections/Title row
| table style = float:right;clear:right;margin-left:1em;
| title        = New South Wales colonial election, 3 July 1891
| house        = Legislative Assembly
| series       = New South Wales colonial election
| back         = 1889
| forward      = 1894
| enrolled     = 
| total_votes  = 180,449
| turnout %    = 64.40
| turnout chg  = +4.87
| informal     = 3,680
| informal %   = 2.00
| informal chg = +0.28
}}

|}

Retiring members

See also
 Members of the New South Wales Legislative Assembly, 1891–1894
 Candidates of the 1891 New South Wales colonial election

Notes

References

Bibliography

1891
1891 elections in Australia
June 1891 events
July 1891 events
1890s in New South Wales